Burnwell may refer to:

Burnwell, Alabama, a community in Walker County
Burnwell, Kentucky, a community in Pike County
Burnwell, West Virginia, a community in Kanawha County
Burnwell meteorite, a meteorite fallen in Kentucky